Melicope denhamii is a plant in the family Rutaceae. It is named for the 19th century Royal Navy captain Henry Mangles Denham.

Description

Distribution and habitat
Melicope denhamii grows naturally from Borneo to the Philippines and south to Fiji. In Sabah its habitat is forests and swamps from sea-level to  altitude.

References

denhamii
Flora of Borneo
Flora of the Philippines
Flora of Papuasia
Flora of Fiji
Flora of Vanuatu
Plants described in 1865